Love After Love  is a 2020 Chinese erotic romance drama film directed by Ann Hui, and starring Ma Sichun, Faye Yu, Eddie Peng, Chang Chun-ning and Fan Wei. The film had its world premiere at the 77th Venice International Film Festival on September 8, 2020. It is scheduled to be theatrically released in China on October 22, 2021.

The film marked the third time Hui directed an Eileen Chang adaptation (following 1984's Love In A Fallen City and 1997's Eighteen Springs). It was an adaption of Chang's the short story Aloeswood Incense: The First Brazier, sprawling love story set in 1940s Hong Kong.

Synopsis
Set in Hong Kong shortly before the Second World War, Ge Weilong (Sandra Ma) plays a young girl who travels from Shanghai to Hong Kong in pursuit of education, but ends up working for her aunt seducing rich and powerful men.

Cast
 Ma Sichun as Ge Weilong
 Faye Yu as Aunt Liang
 Eddie Peng as Qiao Qiqiao (George Qiao)
 Janine Chang as Ni'er
 Fan Wei as Situ Xie
 Zhang Jianing as Sui Sui
 Yin Fang as Lu Zhaolin
 Isabella Leong as Ji Jie
 Paul Chun as Sir Qiao Cheng
 Michelle Bai as Mrs Xin
 Wu Yanshu

Release 
The film had its world premiere at the 77th Venice International Film Festival on September 8, 2020. It also screened at the 25th Busan International Film Festival on October 23, 2020, and at the 33rd Tokyo International Film Festival on October 31, 2020.

Awards and nominations

References

External links
 

2020s Mandarin-language films
2020 romantic drama films
Chinese romantic drama films
Films based on Chinese novels
Films based on works by Eileen Chang
Films directed by Ann Hui
Films set in China
Films set in Fujian
Films shot in Shanghai
Films shot in Fujian
Films with screenplays by Wang Anyi